Lemonia sacrosancta is a moth in the family Brahmaeidae (older classifications placed it in Lemoniidae). It was described by Rudolf Püngeler in 1902.

References

Brahmaeidae
Moths described in 1902